Yulia Sergeevna Shoigu (born 4 May 1977) is a Russian psychologist who is the current director of the Center of Emergency Psychological Aid of the Ministry of Emergency Situations. She was appointed in 2002 and is concurrently the Vice-President of the Russian Psychological Society. She is the eldest daughter of Sergei Shoigu, the current Minister of Defense of Russia.  He served as the Minister of Emergency Situations from 1991-2012.

Early life and education
Shoigu was born on 4 May 1977 in the city of Krasnoyarsk to Irina Shoigu and Sergei Shoigu, who was studying at the Krasnoyarsk Polytechnic Institute with a major in civil engineering at that time. She has a sister named Kseniya Shoigu. Due to the nature of the work of her father, the family often changed residence. Yulia graduated from a secondary school in Moscow in 1994, and was admitted to the Faculty of Psychology of Moscow State University.

Career
In 1999, after graduating from university she came to work in the Center for Emergency and Psychological Aid of the EMERCOM and started to work as a psychologist. In 2001, Shoigu was appointed Deputy Director, and a year later the director of the Center. At various times, Shoigu participated in the provision of psychological assistance to the victims of the terrorist attacks, hostage-taking, after man-made disasters in Moscow, 1995 Neftegorsk earthquake, S7 Airlines Flight 778, Kursk submarine disaster and other emergency situations in Russia and abroad. She gained her PhD as the author of scientific works on the psychology of extreme situations; her PhD thesis was named "Professional psychological selection of cadets of universities of the Ministry of Emergency Situations of Russia - future rescuers" and defended in 2003.

Personal life
Yulia Shoigu is married to the Deputy Prosecutor General of Russia Alexey Zakharov, and has two children, a daughter named Daria, and a son named Kirill.

Awards 
She has been awarded with various state and departmental awards:
Medal of the Order  For Merit to the Fatherland 1st class
Medal of the Order  For Merit to the Fatherland 2nd class
Medal "For Life Saving" (2019)

References

Living people
1977 births
Shoigu family
People from Krasnoyarsk
Recipients of the Medal of the Order "For Merit to the Fatherland" I class
Recipients of the Medal of the Order "For Merit to the Fatherland" II class
Moscow State University alumni
Russian women psychologists
Russian psychologists
21st-century psychologists